Bidak (also Romanized as Bīdak; also known as Qaşr-e Bīdak) is a village in Bidak Rural District, in the Central District of Abadeh County, Fars Province, Iran. At the 2006 census, its population was 2,479, in 598 families.

References 

Populated places in Abadeh County